The Teaching Institute also known as the Training Institute ( Maa'had al-taa'lim) is a Lebanese Armed Forces training center, first established on August 7, 1961 as a teaching school in north Lebanon. However, it has been restructured, reconstructed, and reorganized many times throughout the years of Lebanon's civil war. Its last major overhaul was in 2000.

History
The institute was established on August 7, 1961; as of September 1, 1967 the institute became an independent unity. The current structure of the institute is a result of many changes throughout the years up till 2000 and is as follows:
 School commandment and unity of commandment and service.
 Defense battalion.
 Logistic battalion.
 Non-commissioned-officers school.
 Infantry school.
 Specialized schools range.

Mission

The mission of the teaching institute is to provide the non-commissioned-officers and recruited soldiers with all stages of military training according to the dependent schools.

Schools

Non-commissioned officers school
The school was founded in May 1967, and is headquartered at Mohamed Makki military base. Its mission is to train candidates for three years to get promoted to a sergeant.

Admission requirements:
 The candidate must be Lebanese for more than ten years.
 He should not be convicted to any offense or try to commit it to any foul crime, nor sentenced to more than six months in prison.
 He must be a person of a good standing, not addicted to alcohol, drugs or gamble.
 He must not be applied to any entrance exam to any instruction of the national ministry of defense and eliminated for cheating.
 He must have passed the G.C.S.E.S (grade 9) or any official equivalent.
 He must be, in addition to the above mentioned requirements, single, widowed without children or divorced without children.

Infantry school
The school was founded on August 7, 1961, and is headquartered at Mohamed Makki military base. Its mission is to train conscripts as well as all recruited soldiers to pass any rank (study offices).

Specialized schools range
Founded on December 24, 1983, and is headquartered at Mohamed Makki military base. Its mission is to train dependent specializations in addition to qualitative section sessions inside all offices.
The specialization schools are:
 Management school
 Transportation school
 Signal school
 Armor school
 Artillery school
 Engineering school

Support battalions
In addition to the schools, the institute has its own logistics battalion founded on August 7, 1961, and is responsible to provide the schools with logistics and other basic needs. In addition, the institute has its own defense battalion founded on the same date, and it is responsible to safeguard and defend the institute.

References

Lebanese Army Academies